A firestop or fire-stopping is a form of passive fire protection that is used to seal around openings and between joints in a fire-resistance-rated wall or floor assembly. Firestops are designed to maintain the fire-resistance rating of a wall or floor assembly intended to impede the spread of fire and smoke.

Description 
Firestops prevent unprotected horizontal and vertical penetrations in a fire-resistance-rated wall or floor assembly from creating a route by which fire and smoke can spread that would otherwise have been fire resisting construction, e.g. where a pipe passes through a firewall.

Fire stopping is also to seal around gaps between fire resisting constructions, e.g. the linear gap between a wall and the floor above, in order for construction to form a complete barrier to fire and smoke spread.

Opening types 
Firestops are used in:
 Electrical, mechanical, and structural penetrations
 Unpenetrated openings (such as openings for future use)
 Re-entries of existing firestops
 Control or sway joints in fire-resistance-rated wall or floor assemblies
 Junctions between fire-resistance-rated wall or floor assemblies
 Head-of-wall (HOW) joints, where non-load-bearing wall assemblies meet floor assemblies

Numeric characters are used to identify what penetrant, if any, can be found within the present system and help identify what UL-tested system was used.

Classification for penetrations and the barriers they penetrate, are categorized by a standardized letter-number system that has been adopted by all firestop products manufacturers.  A typical system would consist of several letters, followed by a series of numbers indicating the type of penetrant that is passing through the particular barrier ex: (FB-5533.)

Materials 
Components include intumescents, cementitious mortars, silicone, firestop pillows, mineral fibers, and rubber compounds.

Maintenance 
Firestops should be maintained in accordance with listing and approval use and compliance. Construction documentation sometimes includes an inventory of all firestops in a building, with drawings indicating their location and certification listings. Using this, a building owner can meet the fire code relating to fire barriers. Improper repairs may otherwise result, which would violate the fire code and could allow a fire to travel between areas intended by code to be separated during a fire.

Tagging 
Proper maintenance is enhanced by the installation of tags on each side of the firestop with information needed to refer to documents indicating approved procedures for the original installation and re-entries. This requires knowledge of the certification listing used for each opening of a building joint or a penetrant through-penetration seal.

Ratings 
Firestop materials are not rated per se. They receive a fire rating by combining materials in an arrangement specific to the item (a pipe or cable, for example) penetrating the fire-rated wall or floor and the construction arrangement of the fire-rated wall or floor. A two-hour-rated pipe-penetration firestop may consist of a layer of caulking over packed mineral wool. The arrangement, not the caulking, provides the two-hour rating. The individual firestop materials and the overall firestop assembly are listed.

Testing and certification 

Certification listings include those available from:
 Underwriters Laboratories
 Underwriters Laboratories of Canada
 Deutsches Intitut für Bautechnik (Germany)
FIRAS scheme- Warrington Fire (UK) 
 Efectis (Netherlands, France, and Norway)
 FM Global

Regulations and compliance 
When the installed configuration does not comply with the appropriate certification listing, the fire-resistance rating may be lower than expected. Each opening in a fire-resistance-rated wall or floor in a building must have a certification listing. There are thousands of listings from various certification and testing laboratories. The Canadian and United States Underwriters Laboratories publish books listing firestop manufacturers who have contracted with them for testing and certification.

Inadequate firestopping

No firestopping 
Older buildings often lack firestops. A thorough inspection can identify all vertical and horizontal fire barriers and their fire ratings, and all breaches in these barriers (which can be sealed with approved methods).

Non-listed attempts 

Firestops created by contractors or building maintenance personnel which are not listed are not credited with an adequate fire resistance rating for building-code compliance purposes. They are usually short-term, cost-cutting measures at the expense of fire safety and code compliance. One common error is citing a listing for a product which may be for another use. An insulation with an active listing of a certain flame-spread rating is unacceptable for firestopping purposes.

See also 

 Firestop pillow
 Penetrant
 Penetration (firestop)
 Endothermic
 Annulus (firestop)
 Product certification
 Certification mark
 Silicone foam
 Packing (firestopping)
 Sleeve (construction)
 Heat sink

References

External links 
 Gütegemeinschaft Brandschutz im Ausbau German passive fire protection association
 International Firestop Council An International association of firestop manufacturers, consultants, inspectors, and contractors
 Efectis Test Laboratory
 UL and International Firestop Council (IFC) video Close enough is not good enough: A demonstration of Proper vs Improper Firestopping
 UL Essay On Firestops
 Deutsches Institut für Bautechnik (DIBt)
 iBMB a part of Technische Universität Braunschweig
 Underwriters' Laboratories of Canada (ULC)
 Underwriters Laboratories

Building materials
Passive fire protection